Bo Airport  is a regional airport located in Bo, the second largest city of Sierra Leone. It is mainly used for regional and diplomatic aircraft to Bo District. The airport is operated by the Sierra Leonean Airports Authority.

References

Airports in Sierra Leone
Buildings and structures in Bo, Sierra Leone